Ettingshausen is an inhabited place in Reiskirchen, Giessen, Hesse, Germany.

Ettingshausen may also refer to:
 Albert von Ettingshausen (1850-1932), Austrian physicist
 Ettingshausen effect
 Nernst-Ettingshausen effect
 Andreas von Ettingshausen (1796-1878), German mathematician and physicist
 Andrew Ettingshausen (born 1965), Australian rugby league player
 Colin von Ettingshausen (born 1971), German rower who competed at the 1992 Summer Olympics
 Baron Constantin von Ettingshausen (1826-1897), Austrian botanist

See also
 Ettinghausen (disambiguation)
 Von Ettingshausen, a surname